"Famous" is the second single by the English indie pop band Scouting for Girls to be released from their second studio album, Everybody Wants to Be on TV. The song was released as a digital download on 17 July 2010, with a CD released the following day, on 18 July 2010. The single was added to BBC Radio 1's B Playlist in June 2010.

First performance 
The first performance (before recording) of the song was to a "girl only" audience at Girlguiding UK's "Big Gig" at Wembley Arena on 18 October 2009, marking the centenary of Girlguiding UK.

Promotion 
Scouting For Girls performed the track "Famous" on 4 July 2010 at T4 On The Beach along with various other songs.

Track listing

Music video 
The official music video to accompany the single "Famous" was released on the band's website and YouTube on 23 April 2010, 2 months prior to the release of the actual single. The video features the members of the band sat around in an apartment, as per described in the lyrics "Staying in again on a Saturday night". Stride is then seen reading the owner's manual to the various television screens positioned in the apartment, which refers to the lyric: "I've got 900 channels, but there's nothing to see". The band then perform the single, all the while recording themselves, before placing a video cassette in the video player, resulting in the performance being shown on the television sets. The celebrities named in the video, including Bette Davis and James Dean are all shown on the television screens at various points throughout the video.

Chart performance 
"Famous" debuted on the UK Singles Chart at number 97 on 4 July 2010. The following week the single climbed 48 places to number 49. On 18 July 2010, the single climbed 6 places to number 43. Upon physical release, the single rose a further 6 places to number 37, giving the band its sixth Top 40 single in the UK.

Personnel 
Performance credits
 Vocals: Roy Stride, Greg Churchouse
 Bass: Greg Churchouse
 Percussion: Pete Ellard
 Piano: Roy Stride
 Guitar: Roy Stride

Technical credits
 Production: Andy Green

References

External links 
 Music Video at YouTube
 Lyrics at scoutingforgirls.com
 Scouting for Girls official website 
 Scouting for Girls official YouTube channel

Scouting for Girls songs
2010 singles
2010 songs
Songs written by Roy Stride
Epic Records singles